Clean Air India Movement (CLAIM) is a nationwide launched campaign by Blueair in India on 5 May 2015. The campaign was initiated by the premium air purifier brand Blueair and the key role was played by Vijay Kannan, the India head of Blueair. The ceremonial event took place at the monumental Purana Qila by planting a tree by Kautilya Pandit and Vijay Kannan himself. The Clean Air India Movement is a campaign aimed at engaging, encouraging, and educating Indian citizens to adopt air friendly measures in the interest of the country and its children. "Our campaign aim is to tell people that we are not helpless individuals when it comes to challenging air pollution. Even simple acts by individuals or sole companies such as Blueair can make a difference when it comes to showing responsibility and care, which is why we have taken the initiative to make the call and mobilisation for action," said Kannan.

The campaign was launched on World Asthma Day and apparently, reached over 500 million people across the nation through a mix of online and offline activities during the course of campaign. The endeavour behind the campaign was to facilitate the idea of using air friendly measures by cultivating small habits like, use of public transport, wise use of energy, recycling and re-using, planting trees, properly maintaining the vehicles, use of alternate energy, being environment friendly, using proper technology, replacing the standard light bulbs with CFLs, etc. to begin with. Also, the initiative promoted encouraging others and taking up of community initiatives for a better environment.

The campaign led a Citizens’ Awareness and Attitude Survey and a Lung Health Screening Test suggesting that 35 percent of Kolkata’s school-going children, 36 per cent of Bangalore’s school-going children and 27 per cent of Mumbai’s school-going children suffer poor lung health as a result of air pollution.

Elements 
There have been various elements to the campaign that embodies the campaign like Share to Aware, wherein, people were asked to share on their profile pages of various social networking sites, an image of the educational image that was shared with them. It also included, Clean Air Plantation Appeal, Spot the Kilvish, Make the Red Light Blue Light, etc. all with the aim of sensitising people about a cleaner atmosphere.

Events
Before and after the campaign was launched, there were several benefiting activities and events that took place primarily in the National Capital Region. Events like plantation on the day of the campaign launch, and various other activation programs like, flash dance performances in several malls and as part of Raahgiri in Dwarka and Noida areas around New Delhi. The high point of the performances was the bird formation whereby, the people were informed that not only humans but other members of our ecosystem including fauna are affected by the impure air. Other activation programs included several road shows on many traffic light areas in New Delhi and grand celebration of the World Environment Day at the India Gate. The various events were covered by the print and digital media alike with full coverage in many leading dailies. Other activities include, the pledge signing in Cities like Delhi, Mumbai, Kolkata, Bangalore where around 50,000 and more people signed large boards pledging to do everything possible for protecting the environment.

Developments

2015
In the light of the campaign, the Central and the State Government have taken some initiatives as well. The Union Minister of State for Environment and Forest Prakash Javadekar vowed to hold tougher pollution laws soon, including the Centre rolling out air index in 11 cities of the nation. Along with this, there is a ban on diesel vehicles older than 10 years in the national capital. The office of the Lieutenant Governor of Delhi gave a nod to the cycling policy for the city. The effort was taken one step ahead when the Prime Minister Narendra Modi himself initiated a plantation drive followed by an appeal by the Delhi Government to all the MLAs to plant 2,000 saplings each in their constituencies. This was followed by the Delhi Government hardening their stance against open burning of trash.

In unison with the Transport and Rural Development Minister of Delhi, Gopal Rai, and Vijay Kannan supports Car Free Day on 22 November 2015 in district Dwarka, New Delhi.
With the vision of air purification and better environment with regards to pollution in the atmosphere, immense support was given by Vijay Kannan, the India head of Blueair. Kannan supported the idea of reducing on the pollution levels in the city by reducing the vehicular emission and has supported the many ways of how as an individual we all are capable of helping each other in bringing the toxicity of the air in control. The Clean Air India Movement, initiated by the Blueair, has been associated with a huge spectrum of activities that promote better environment and embraces full support to Car Free Day's in Delhi and a Car Free Day in the national capital region.

2016

See Your Lung Campaign:
New Delhi is termed as one of the most polluted cities in the world. Therefore, the government is doing all it can to tackle land, water and air pollution in the city. The See Your Lung campaign comes as a helping hand for it in terms of bringing forth the message of anti-pollution to the citizens. Vijay Kannan, the founder of the  See Your Lung Campaign, said that people do not realize the risk that they are putting themselves and others by using motor vehicles. He further stressed on the point that what’s the point in using a vehicle for conveyance when a cycle can do all the work.
Kannan is also the founder of the Clean India Air Movement (CLAIM) under which free car pool service was offered to around 10,000 citizens of New Delhi. CLAIM and the See Your Lung initiatives have quickly picked up the pace in terms of accomplishing their goals. The probability of the future being a bright, pollution-free one is slowly but surely turning into a reality.

Save Your Lung Campaign:
On the eve of World Asthma Day, Clean Air India Movement, launched the "Save Your Lungs" campaign to increase awareness of the ill-effects of rising air-pollution levels. Clean Air India Movement — a nationwide campaign to spread awareness about air pollution — has started from Gurgaon. The campaign will be taken to many cities across the country, including Delhi, Mumbai, Bengaluru and Kolkata.

Plantation Drive On World Environment Day:
Over 200 people, including students, participated in a plantation drive on occasion of World Environment Day - 5 June 2016. The drive was organised as part of the Clean Air India Movement (CLAIM). The participants marched from India Gate to Guru Harikrishna Public School at Purana Quila road, where the saplings were planted.

Awards 
Clean Air India Movement (CLAIM) has been honoured with the "Energy and Environment Foundation Global Award 2016", which recognizes significant contributions to raising awareness about toxic levels of air pollution in India and initiating ways to tackle the problem. Awarded by the Energy and Environment Foundation (EEF), the prize was awarded to CLAIM, a program launched by indoor air cleaning leader Blueair, during a ceremony at the 7th World Renewable Energy Technology Congress & Expo-2016 at Ashoka Hall, Manekshaw Centre, Parade Road (Near IGI Airport), New Delhi, India."It is a great honour to be recognized for initiating and purseing positive steps to address the grave problem of air pollution that threatens human health and wellness in most urban environments across our country," said Vijay Kannan, head of Blueair India, who has played a key role in driving the CLAIM initiative. He said that Blueair’s ambition with CLAIM is to drive a non-partisan program geared to raise awareness among women, children and men about the need to take control over the  ‘alarming levels of air pollution’.

Blueair Clean Air India Movement apps 
In 2015, Blueair launched an air monitoring app. Blueair said in a statement the app gathers real-time air pollution information from a host of monitoring stations in Indian cities, including Delhi, Mumbai, Hyderabad, Chennai and Kolkata, and warns users of air pollution .

Gallery

References

Environmental organisations based in India
Air pollution in India